Rajadhi Raja is a 1989 Indian Tamil-language action comedy film, directed by R. Sundarrajan and written by Panchu Arunachalam. The film stars Rajinikanth in a dual role, with Nadhiya and Radha portraying his characters' love interests. It revolves around Raja, a rich estate owner's son who seeks to avenge his father's death. He is aided in his quest by Chinnarasu, a lookalike.

Rajadhi Raja was released on 4 March 1989. The film became a box office blockbuster.

Plot 

A rich estate owner Vishwanathan is killed by his second wife Sarasu and her brother Aadimoolam for his property. The estate owner's son Rajashekar  returns from the United States and learns of this. In order to bring the culprits to book, he makes his friend Sethupathi, a rickshaw puller, act as Raja. But soon, Aadimoolam learns of this, kills Sethu and frames Raja as the killer. Raja is sentenced to death. In between, Raja loves Senkamalam, sister of an employee in his estate.

In the same village where Raja lives, there exists his lookalike, Chinnaraasu, whose aim in life is to wed his sweetheart Lakshmi. Raja escapes from jail, meets Chinnaraasu and makes Chinnaraasu take his place in jail. After many twist and turns, Raja brings the culprits to book. At the end, Raja marries Senkamalam and Chinnarasu marries Lakshmi.

Cast 
Rajinikanth as Rajashekar and Chinnaraasu
Nadhiya as Lakshmi
Radha as Senkamalam
Radha Ravi  as Aadhimoolam
Vinu Chakravarthy as Nallamuthu Gounder
Janagaraj as Sethupathi
Anandaraj as Kangeyan
Vijayakumar as Vishwanathan
Y. Vijaya as Sarasu
S. N. Vasanth as Kathavarayan
G. Srinivasan as Advocate Chidambaram
Pradeep Shakthi as Valparai Varathan
Idichapuli Selvaraj as Hotel servant
Balu Anand as Lorry Driver

Production

Development 
R. Sundarrajan initially planned to direct Amman Kovil Kizhakale with Rajinikanth which did not happen. When Sundarrajan met Panchu Arunachalam who was finding plot for a new project with collaboration of S. P. Muthuraman and Rajinikanth, he narrated the plotline of Rajathi Raja which impressed both Rajinikanth and Arunachalam. Rajinikanth insisted Sundarrajan to direct the film who relented after initial rejections to direct the film. The film was produced under Ilaiyaraaja's brother R. D. Bhaskar under their home banner Pavalar Creations. Cinematography was handled by Rajarajan, and editing by B. Lenin and V. T. Vijayan.

Casting 
Initially, Revathi and Rupini were reported to be the two lead actresses. Due to date clashes, Revathi's role was given to Radha and Rupini's role to Nadhiya. This was the last film for Radha to act with Rajinikanth and it was the only film for Nadhiya with Rajinikanth. Radha Ravi, who portrayed one of the antagonists, initially "approached the role like a serious villain". However, when he was told that his character knows Rajinikanth’s real identity, "I decided to play the character like a muff, and when I suggested the idea to director Sundarrajan, he accepted it". Ravi also intentionally mimicked his father M. R. Radha's voice and took inspiration from his father's character from the 1961 film Paava Mannippu.

Filming 
The song "Vaa Vaa" was initially planned to shoot at Ooty but due to heavy rainfall, the crew then decided to shoot the song at Coonoor and again went back to Ooty during its non rainy day and completed the remaining shoot. Radha Ravi said Rajinikanth wanted this scene where there will be a snake in the hand, Sundarrajan objected as he felt it was "over the top" but Rajinikanth insisted on this scene because “he liked to have a snake scene in his films for sentimental reasons”. The filming was completed in 50 days.

Soundtrack 
The music was composed by Ilaiyaraaja. The soundtrack became hugely popular and was said to have sold around 22000 units.

Release and reception 
Rajadhi Raja was released on 4 March 1989. Ananda Vikatan rated the film 43 out of 100. N. Krishnaswamy of The Indian Express wrote "[sic] the film is entertaining despite the abundant cliches and to-the-hilt commercialism".

References

External links 
 

1980s action comedy films
1980s masala films
1980s Tamil-language films
1989 films
Films about miscarriage of justice
Films directed by R. Sundarrajan
Films scored by Ilaiyaraaja
Films shot in Ooty
Films with screenplays by Panchu Arunachalam
Indian action comedy films
Indian films about revenge